Wardsville is a village in Cole County, Missouri, United States. The population was 1,599 at the 2020 census. It is part of the Jefferson City, Missouri Metropolitan Statistical Area.

History
A post office called Wardsville was established in 1881, and remained in operation until 1933. The village was named after Junius Ward, the original owner of the town site.

Geography
Wardsville is located at  (38.490408, -92.173616).

Demographics

2010 census
As of the census of 2010, there were 1,506 people, 516 households, and 416 families living in the village. The racial makeup of the village was 97.7% White, 0.6% African American, 0.3% Native American, 0.3% Asian, 0.3% Pacific Islander, and 0.8% from two or more races. Hispanic or Latino of any race were 0.5% of the population.

There were 516 households, of which 49.8% had children under the age of 18 living with them, 66.5% were married couples living together, 9.9% had a female householder with no husband present, 4.3% had a male householder with no wife present, and 19.4% were non-families. 16.9% of all households were made up of individuals, and 8% had someone living alone who was 65 years of age or older. The average household size was 2.92 and the average family size was 3.28.

The median age in the village was 35.3 years. 33% of residents were under the age of 18; 6.8% were between the ages of 18 and 24; 26.2% were from 25 to 44; 24.7% were from 45 to 64; and 9.4% were 65 years of age or older. The gender makeup of the village was 48.5% male and 51.5% female.

2000 census
As of the census of 2000, there were 976 people, 343 households, and 276 families living in the village. The population density was 402.4 people per square mile (155.1/km). There were 347 housing units at an average density of 143.1 per square mile (55.1/km). The racial makeup of the village was 99.59% White, 0.10% Native American, and 0.31% from two or more races. Hispanic or Latino of any race were 0.31% of the population.

There were 343 households, out of which 45.5% had children under the age of 18 living with them, 72.0% were married couples living together, 6.4% had a female householder with no husband present, and 19.5% were non-families. 17.5% of all households were made up of individuals, and 8.5% had someone living alone who was 65 years of age or older. The average household size was 2.85 and the average family size was 3.23.

In the village, the population was spread out, with 31.4% under the age of 18, 6.4% from 18 to 24, 30.9% from 25 to 44, 21.3% from 45 to 64, and 10.0% who were 65 years of age or older. The median age was 35 years. For every 100 females, there were 97.6 males. For every 100 females age 18 and over, there were 96.5 males.

The median income for a household in the village was $57,813, and the median income for a family was $62,188. Males had a median income of $37,361 versus $28,482 for females. The per capita income for the village was $21,925. About 1.5% of families and 1.9% of the population were below the poverty line, including 1.0% of those under age 18 and 5.4% of those age 65 or over.

References

Villages in Cole County, Missouri
Jefferson City metropolitan area
Villages in Missouri